{{DISPLAYTITLE:C14H14O2}}
The molecular formula C14H14O2 (molar mass: 214.260 g/mol, exact mass: 214.0994 u) may refer to:

 Ichthyothereol
 Lunularin

Molecular formulas